Giorgio Pisanò (Ferrara, 30 January 1924 – Milan, 17 October 1997) was an Italian journalist, essayist and fascist politician.

Biography 
Giorgio Pisanò was born on 30 January 1924 in Ferrara, the first of five children to his father Luigi, an Apulian law graduate from San Vito dei Normanni who worked as a civil servant. There he met his future wife, Iolanda Cristanti, in the 1920s  before moving along with his family to Taranto, where he received his high-school diploma during World War II.

World War II 
Pisano joined the GILF in 1942, at the age of 18, leading a company trained in Search and rescue following bombing raids. Giorgio was in Cassibile on the very days the Armistice of Cassibile was signed. Along with a group of young fascists, Giorgio organized the reopening of the Casa del Fascio and the occupation of the abandoned "Gavinana" barracks awaiting support from nearby German forces. He soon volunteered for Decima Flottiglia MAS, asking to be part of the NP's (Nuotatori Paracadutisti, Marine Paratroopers). and received training in Jesolo and Tradate. He was intelligence collection missions behind enemy lines, along with Pistoiese soldier Ruy Blas Biagi. In 1944, he was captured by British forces during his attempt to return from a special operation near Rome. Although not identified as fascist agent, Giorgio was imprisoned for a month in Arezzo.

After returning to northern Italy, Pisanò received the Iron Cross 1st and 2nd Class by the Abwehr and was promoted twice for distinguished service. He served as a 28th "Ruy Blas Blagi" Black Brigade lieutenant in Valtellina during the ending phase of the war, assigned to the special service of the General Headquarters.

On 20 April 1945 he joined the Ridotto Alpino Repubblicano and, on the 27th, a National Republican Guard Special Border Militia column led by Major Renato Vanna.

He was taken prisoner by partisans the next day, on April 28, at Ponte and held in Sondrio, where he reported of firing-squad executions  through May 13, when the carabinieri took control of the prison. From 29 August to 26 October 1945 he remained imprisoned in the San Vittore, Milan. He was then transferred to the Allied concentration camp R707 di Terni and finally to Rimini where he remained until November 1946.

He reunited with his now rattled family following the purging of his father. He began smuggling between Italy and Switzerland before rediscovering politics and journalism, his lifetime profession.

Post-war and political militancy 
In 1947, Pisanò was a co-founder and the first secretary of the Italian Social Movement (Movimento Sociale Italiano; MSI). His career in journalism would begin in 1948 as editor and correspondent for the neo-fascist weekly "Meridiano d'Italia," formerly led by Franco De Agazio, There, together with Franco Maria Servello, he began investigating post-war homicides committed by partisans, many of which were tied to the mystery of the Gold of Dongo.

Pisanò was a national council member of the Youth Students and Workers Group of the MSI in 1949. In 1951, he founded and held the first presidency in Lombardy La Giovine Italia.

Journalism and non-fiction writing 
In 1954, now a professional journalist, he took a job at Oggi, a weekly periodical founded by Angelo Rizzoli and directed by Edilio Rusconi. In 1958 Pisanò defended Raoul Ghiani in the unsolved Fenaroli murder case, along with the Italcasse scandal, which involved "black funds" to political parties and the granting of questionable loans uncovered in an investigation by the Bank of Italy.

Rusconi—who in the meantime had founded Gente magazine—commissioned Pisanò in 1960 to collect all the photographic and documentary material on the Resistance for a report in a weekly to be published in instalments. In the same year, he married Fanny Crespi who bore him two children, Alessandra and Alberto.

In 1963 Pisanò founded the weekly Secolo XX ("20th Century") in which he began to controversial public news on "burning issues." He would cause a particular stir following the investigation he published on the mysterious death of the head of Eni, Enrico Mattei.

Alongside his journalistic writing in those years were his essays in historical non-fiction, with several texts about World War II and fascism during the RSI such as Blood Calls Blood (1962), The Generation That Did Not Surrender (1964), History of civil war in Italy, 1943–1945 (1965), The Latest in Gray-Green, History of the armed forces of the Italian Social Republic (1967) Mussolini and the Jews (1967), and Black Pen, History and battles of the Italian Alps. He spoke at the Conference of the Parco dei Principi Hotel in 1965 on the revolutionary war based on anti-communism.

In 1968 he revived the weekly Candido, heir to the one founded by Giovannino Guareschi and which had ceased publication in 1961, assuming the position of director which he kept until 1992. Candido led many journalistic news campaigns, coming to openly denounce the socialist leader Giacomo Mancini. His protest against socialist leader Mancini culminated in being accused by Dino De Laurentiis of extortion in 1971 and his incarceration in Regina Coeli, where he spent 114 days before being acquitted of all charges by the Court of Rome on July 14 and released. On 13 March 1972 Pisanò was a victim of the first attack on the part of the Red Brigades, followed by two others directed against Candido's editors and production facilities.

Candido's 1980 ran a particularly virulent campaign aimed at demonstrating that behind Aldo Moro's murder in 1978, there was an interweaving of the interests of shady persons connected to the Lockheed bribery scandals. In 1982 Pisanò covered the death of banker Roberto Calvi, appearing on television with Calvi's bag, delivering it live to the director of TG2 of RAI.

Political activity and parliament 
Pisanò was elected senator in 1972 by the MSI, in the Lombardy district.

Reelected to five consecutive terms (1976, 1979, 1983 and 1987) until 1992, he was a member of the permanent Parliamentary Committee for Defense and Constitutional Affairs, the Parliamentary Committee of RAI Supervision, the Antimafia Parliamentary Committee and of the Parliamentary Committee of P2.

From 1980 to 1994 he was city councilor of Cortina d'Ampezzo.

A year after the 1988 death of Almirante, Pisanò founded a comunitarian faction within the MSI; after his exit from the party on 25 July 1991 the faction became the Fascism and Freedom Movement (Movimento Fascismo e Libertà; MFL), with Pisanò as national secretary.

The MFL was the only party to expressly refer to fascism with the symbol itself, which included and highlighted in the centre a beam of red, making explicit reference to the ideologies of the Italian Social Republic and the social right, such as corporatism, the socialization of the economy, monetary taxation and nationalism.

Contemporary trials for violation of the 1952 Scelba law — which criminalized the defence of fascism — led to the acquittal of Pisanò and other members of the party since contrary to the offence identified by law, the party supported a bicameral Presidential Republic with President of the Republic enjoying full powers and elected by the people, instead of the re-establishment of the fascist dictatorship. The party elected some municipal councillors, especially in Asti, on the occasion of the 1992 general election.

In the 1990s, Pisanò returned to publishing, writing several texts about the Italian Social Republic. In 1995, after the "svolta di Fiuggi" — when the Italian Social Movement made a turning point away from fascist symbolism to become a bona fide and legal force in politics — and the definitive transformation of the party into the National Alliance, Pisanò decided to associate with Pino Rauti in the conservation project of a historic Italian Right-wing party, which subsequently gave rise to the Tricolour Flame (Flamma Tricolore). A few months later, however, he left political life due to his deteriorating health.

Giorgio Pisanò died in Milan on 17 October 1997, after a long illness.

Published works 
Pisanò published various books regarding Italian history.
 Il vero volto della guerra civile. Documentario fotografico, Milano, Rusconi, 1961.
 Sangue chiama sangue, Milano, Pidola, 1962.
 La generazione che non-si è arresa, Milano, Pidola, 1964.
 Giovanni XXIII. Le sue parole, la sua vita, le sue opere e le fotografie più belle. La prima biografia del papa santo, a cura di, Milano, FPE, 1965.
 Storia della guerra civile in Italia, 1943–1945, 3 voll., Milano, FPE, 1965–1966.
 Gli ultimi in grigioverde. Storia delle forze armate della Repubblica Sociale Italiana (1943–1945), 4 voll., Milano, FPE, 1967.
 Mussolini e gli ebrei, Milano, FPE, 1967.
 Penna nera. Storia e battaglie degli alpini d'Italia, con , 2 voll., Milano, FPE, 1968.
 L'altra faccia del pianeta "P2". Testo integrale della Relazione conclusiva di minoranza presentata al Parlamento dal rappresentante del MSI-DN, Milano, Edizioni del Nuovo Candido, 1984.
 L'omicidio Calvi nell'inchiesta del commissario P2 Giorgio Pisanò e nelle deposizioni della vedova. Con gli atti inediti del processo di Londra, Milano, GEI, 1985.
 Storia del Fascismo, 3 voll., Milano, Pizeta, 1988–1990.
 , con Paolo Pisanò, Milano, Mursia, 1992. [./Fonti librarie ]
 , Milano, Il Saggiatore, 1996. [./Fonti librarie ]
 Io, fascista, Milano, Il Saggiatore, 1997. [./Fonti librarie ]

Notes

Sources 

Italian male journalists
1924 births
1997 deaths
Italian military personnel of World War II
Italian fascists
Italian Social Movement politicians
20th-century Italian journalists
20th-century Italian male writers